The 2nd album of Stillste Stund.

Track listing
"Gambit" – 4:39
"Mühle Mahlt" – 6:15
"Grotesk" – 4:36
"Wir sind Energie" – 5:15
"Nexus" – 4:32
"Alice (Der Spiegeltanz)" – 5:50
"Ebenholz, Schnee & Blut" – 5:11
"Leben ist nur ein Traum" – 6:07
"Unter Kreuzen" – 6:10
"An das Morgenlicht" – 7:51
"Ursprung Paradoxon" – 7:09
"Die Macht der Stille" – 3:53

Info
 All tracks arranged, recorded, mixed, written and produced by Oliver Uckermann
 Lyrics on track 9 written by Oliver Uckermann & Birgit Strunz
 Male vocals by Oliver Uckermann
 Female vocals on tracks 1, 3, 4, 6, 7 and 9 by Birgit Strunz
 Female vocals on track 2 by Inanis Kurzweil
 Female vocals on track 8 by Birgit Strunz & Inanis Kurzweil
 Album artwork and sleeve design by Birgit Strunz

References

External links
 Ursprung Paradoxon at Musicbrainz.org
 Discographie at official website
 Stillste Stund Discography Info

2001 albums
Alice In... albums
Stillste Stund albums